Weyers is a surname. Notable people with the name include:

Denise Weyers, South Africa cricketer
Howard Weyers (1934–2018), American football player and assistant coach
Marius Weyers (born 1945), South African actor

See also
Weijers, variant spelling of the same name 
Weyer (disambiguation)
Weyers Cave, is a census-designated place in Augusta County, Virginia, United States
Weyers Cave School, is a historic public school building located at Weyers Cave, Augusta County, Virginia (US)